Xixia District (Xiao'erjing: ثِ‌ثِيَا ٿِيُوِ) is one of three urban districts of the prefecture-level city of Yinchuan, the capital of Ningxia Hui Autonomous Region, Northwest China, bordering Inner Mongolia to the west.

Characteristics

Xixia District has seen rapid industrial development in recent years. However, it is a largely agricultural district, and at the same time that industry develops in the district, the cultivation of dairy cows and food crops has continued unabated. The district government is located on East Huaiyuan Road, and the district's postal code is 750021.

Administrative divisions
Xixia District has 5 subdistricts and 2 towns.
5 subdistricts
 Helanshanxilu
 Ninghualu
 Shuofanglu
 Wenchanglu
 Beijingxilu

2 towns
 Zhenbeibu
 Xingjing

County-level divisions of Ningxia
Yinchuan